Edder may refer to:

Edder Delgado (born 1986), Honduran international footballer
Edder Farías (born 1988), Venezuelan footballer
Edder Fuertes (born 1992), Ecuadorian footballer
Edder Nelson (born 1986), Costa Rican football player
Edder Pérez (born 1983), Venezuelan footballer
Edder Vaca (born 1985), Ecuadorian footballer

See also
Best Day Edder